

Incumbents

Events

Ongoing
 COVID-19 pandemic in Kazakhstan

January 
 January 1 - the chairmanship of the Eurasian Economic Union passes from Belarus to Kazakhstan.
 January 2 - Death Penalty officially abolished after nearly a two decade recession.
 January 10 - Kazakh legislative election
 January 15 - Askar Mamin is reappointed as Prime Minister of Kazakhstan by President Kassym-Jomart Tokayev. Nurlan Nigmatulin is also reelected as the Chair of the Mazhilis.

February 
 10 February – Small protest against prosecution on Uyghurs in Mainland China which resulted to crackdown.
 25 February – Murat Nurtileu is named as the new Deputy Head of Presidential Administration.
 28 February –  At least a dozen are arrested by the police demanding the release of all political prisoners who have been arrested and detained during the unrest in the legislative elections.

March 
 8 March – First Women's March held in Almaty.

April 
 17 April – Three crewmen from the International Space Station griping their spacejet of Soyuz MS-17 land on Kazakh Soil.

May 
 The session of the Supreme Eurasian Economic Council takes place.
 President Tokayev signs into law a bill that bans selling and leasing agricultural land to foreigners.

December 
 27 November to 5 December — Kazakhstan will host the 2021 MMA World Championships and U20 Youth MMA World Championships in Nur-Sultan.

Deaths 

 24 January - Nikolay Chebotko, Kazakh Olympic cross country skier (2002, 2006, 2010, 2014), traffic collision. (b. 1982)
 3 February – Alizhan Ibragimov, businessman and billionaire (b.1954)
 9 February – Klavdiya Pishchulina, scientist. (b. 1934) 
 16 April – Yessengaly Raushanov (b. 1957), poet

See also

 Outline of Kazakhstan
 Index of Kazakhstan-related articles
 List of Kazakhstan-related topics
 History of Kazakhstan
 List of Kazakhs
 List of Kazakh khans

References

Notes

Citations

Further reading

External links
 Kazakhstan Country Profile; CIA World Fact Book
 Kazakhstan; United Nations Statistics Division

 
2020s in Kazakhstan
Years of the 21st century in Kazakhstan
Kazakhstan
Kazakhstan